The 2011–12 OFC Champions League, also known as the 2012 O-League, was the 11th edition of the Oceanian Club Championship, Oceania's premier club football tournament organized by the Oceania Football Confederation (OFC), and the 6th season under the current OFC Champions League name. It was contested by eight teams from seven countries. The teams were split into two four-team pools, the winner of each pool contesting the title of O-League Champion and the right to represent the OFC at the 2012 FIFA Club World Cup.

The title was won by the defending champions Auckland City.

Participants

From the 2011–12 season, the two New Zealand clubs were placed in different groups (in previous tournaments they were placed in the same group) – one was drawn with the club champions of Fiji, New Caledonia and Tahiti while the other competed in the second group with the champions of Vanuatu, Solomon Islands and Papua New Guinea.

Again no preliminary tournament for the 2011–12 O-League was played. Instead, the champion teams from American Samoa, Samoa, Cook Islands and Tonga would take part in a pilot stand-alone tournament in 2012. It was proposed that this competition would in future seasons became a preliminary tournament with the winner qualifying to play off for a place in the O-League (starting from 2012–13).

Schedule
The match schedule was as follows.

Group stage
Based on seeding, sporting reasons and travel considerations, the OFC Executive Committee separated the teams into two groups in June 2011. A draw was held at the OFC Headquarters in Auckland, New Zealand on 19 July 2011, 14:30 UTC+12:00, to decide the "position" of each team within those groups, which was used to determine the schedule.

In each group, the teams played each other home-and-away in a round-robin format, with the group winner advancing to the final. If two or more teams were tied on points, the tiebreakers would be as follows:
Goal difference
Goals scored
Head-to-head record among teams concerned (points; goal difference; goals scored)
Fair play record
Drawing of lots

Group A

Notes
 Note 1: Rescheduled due to Tefana's involvement in the 2011–12 Coupe de France.
 Note 2: Originally scheduled to be played on 31 March 2012 at Govind Park, Ba, but postponed to 1 April 2012 and moved to Churchill Park, Lautoka, due to a severe storm that caused massive disruption across Fiji and left Govind Park in an unsuitable state to host the fixture. Due to further deterioration in the weather situation and outlook, it was decided to postpone the match to a later date. With Fiji still recovering from the flooding, it was proposed that the match would take place in Auckland.

Group B

Notes
 Note 3: Postponed from 3 December 2011 due to ground availability issues.
 Note 4: Rescheduled due to Auckland City's involvement in the 2011 FIFA Club World Cup.

Final

The winners of the two groups played in the final over two legs, with the order of matches decided by a random draw. The away goals rule applied, with extra time and a penalty shootout used to decide the winner if necessary.

Auckland City won 3–1 on aggregate. As OFC Champions League winners they qualified for the qualifying round of the 2012 FIFA Club World Cup.

Awards
The following awards were given:
Golden Ball (best player):  Albert Riera (Auckland City)
Golden Boot (top scorer):  Manel Expósito (Auckland City)
Golden Gloves (best goalkeeper):  Jacob Spoonley (Auckland City)
Fair Play Award:  Koloale

Goalscorers

Own goals

References

External links
OFC Champions League

OFC Champions League seasons
1